Poothakkulam,  also known as Bhoothakulam,  is a village in Kollam district in the state of Kerala, India. The village is located 3.9 km away from Paravur, 11.4 km from Varkala and 23 km from Kollam. In 2011, it had a population of 628,451 residents. The village covers an area of 16.56 km2.

Geography 
Poothakkulam is located in the southernmost portion of the Kollam district near Idava Nadayara Kayal. The village is bordered by the Paravur municipality in the west, Parippally Panchayath in the east, Chirakkara Panchayath in the north, and the Thiruvananthapuram district in the south.

Topography 

Poothakkulam's elevation is close to sea level, showing at the nearby Bhoothakulam reservoir and surrounding paddy fields.

Educational institutions 

 Govt Higher Secondary School, Bhoothakulam
 Chempakassey Higher Secondary School, Bhoothakulam
 Bhoothakulam North LPS
 Bhoothakulam South LPS
 Kalakkode UPS, Kalakkode
 Harisree Nursery & LP School, Bhoothakulam

Transportation 
The nearest airport is Thiruvananthapuram International Airport (49.8 km) and the nearest railway station is Paravur Railway station (4.5 km). The major road passing through Poothakkulam is Paravur -Parippalli road.

Air 
The nearest airport is Thiruvananthapuram International Airport (49.8 km)

Rail 
Paravur Railway station (4.5 km)

Varkala Sivagiri railway station(13 km)

Road 
Bhoothakulam is well connected to nearby places through roads. Road transport is provided mainly by private transport bus operators and state owned Kerala State Road Transport Corporation.

Major roads 

 Paravur - Paripppally Road
 Bhoothakulam- Ooninmoodu-Varkala Road
 Alinmoodu- Ozhukupara Road
 Vettuvila - Kalakkodu
 Kalakkodu - Bhoothakulam

Industry 
Coir, cashew nuts and hand loom are the major industries of Poothakkulam. Kalakkod Q 23 Co-operative society was established as the first Coir society in Poothakkulam.

Administration 
Poothakkulam is an ISO 9001-2015 certified grama panchayat. It consists of 18 wards and is currently led by Left Democratic Front (Kerala).

The incumbent Panchayat president is Ammini Amma who contested and won from P.H.C Ward.

Poothakkulam is part of Chathannoor (State Assembly constituency) State Assembly constituency, Ithikkara Block Panchayath, Kollam District Panchayat and Kollam (Lok Sabha constituency)

Recognition 

Poothakkulam Panchayath falls under the jurisdiction of Paravur circle inspector.

Culture 
Poothakkulam has a rich cultural heritage. The village contains numerous libraries, cultural societies, and organizations.

Sankara Pillai smaraka grantha sala, Gandhi memorial reading room and Samskarika Nilayam kottuvankonam are some major libraries.

Poothakulam village has numerous captive elephants.

Libraries 

 Shankarapilla Memorial Library
 Priyadharshini Memorial Library& Reading room
 Public Library, Kottuvankonam
 Gandhi Memorial Reading Club & Library, Kalakkode
 Reading room, Paravila

Recreational centres 

 Kalipoyka Children Park
 GHSS Football Stadium
 Mini stadium, Bhoothakulam
Kaveri Elephant Park, Puthenkulam 
Pachayath Park, Kalakkode

Services

Hospitals 

 Government Homeo Dispensary, Poothakkulam
 Community Health Center, Kalakkode
 Government Ayurveda Dispensary, Poothakkulam
 Karthika Hospital, Mavila
 Mohan's Hospital, Edayadi
 Murari Hospital, Ammarathumukku
 JJ Hospital, Puthenkulam
 Santhosh Hospital, Puthenkulam

Financial Institutions 

 Bhoothakulam Service Co-Operative Bank
 Kalakkode Service Co-operative bank
 Indian Overseas Bank, Puthenkulam
 Catholic Syrian Bank, Ooninmoodu

Places of worship 
 Bhoothakulam Sree Dharma Shastha Temple, Bhothakulam
 Ezhamvila Sree Bhadrakali Temple, Bhoothakulam
 Vaikundapuram Mahavishnu Temple, Bhoothakulam
 Punnekulam Temple, Chempakassery
 Mahavishnu Temple, Kottuvankonam
 Mecheryil Bhadra Devi Temple, Bhoothakulam
 Appupan Kavu temple, Bhoothakulam
 Pallathil Kavu temple, Edayadi

References

Villages in Kollam district